"Revenge", originally titled as "Garrett's Revenge", is a song written, produced, and performed by American musician XXXTentacion, released on May 18, 2017, by Bad Vibes Forever and Empire Distribution as the lead single from his debut studio album 17.

Background
This song was previewed on Twitter on May 9 before the death of his friend, Jocelyn Flores, who committed suicide on May 14. XXXTentacion dedicated the song to her after her death. In the description of the song on SoundCloud, it says, "I love you Garette, rest in peace Jocelyn, I will have my revenge upon the world."

Charts

Weekly charts

Year-end charts

Certifications

References

External links

2017 singles
2017 songs
XXXTentacion songs
Empire Distribution singles
Songs written by XXXTentacion
American alternative rock songs
American folk songs
American pop songs